A blue laser is a laser that emits electromagnetic radiation with a wavelength between 360 and 480 nanometers, which the human eye sees as blue or violet.

Blue beams are produced by helium-cadmium gas lasers at 441.6 nm, and argon-ion lasers at 458 and 488 nm. Semiconductor lasers with blue beams are typically based on gallium(III) nitride (GaN; violet color) or indium gallium nitride (often true blue in color, but also able to produce other colors). Both blue and violet lasers can also be constructed using frequency-doubling of infrared laser wavelengths from diode lasers or diode-pumped solid-state lasers.

Diode lasers which emit light at 445 nm are becoming popular as handheld lasers. Lasers emitting wavelengths below 445 nm appear violet (but are sometimes called blue lasers). Some of the most commercially common blue lasers are the diode lasers used in Blu-ray applications which emit 405 nm "violet" light, which is a short enough wavelength to cause fluorescence in some chemicals, in the same way as radiation further into the ultraviolet ("black light") does. Light of a shorter wavelength than 400 nm is classified as ultraviolet.

Devices that employ blue laser light have applications in many areas ranging from optoelectronic data storage at high density to medical applications.

History

Semiconductor lasers

Red lasers can be built on gallium arsenide (GaAs) semiconductors, upon which a dozen layers of atoms are placed to form the part of the laser that generates light from quantum wells. Using methods similar to those developed for silicon, the substrate can be built free of the defects called dislocations, and the atoms laid down so the distance between the ones making up the ground and those of the quantum wells are the same.

However, the best semiconductor for blue lasers is gallium nitride (GaN) crystals, which are much harder to manufacture, requiring higher pressures and temperatures, similar to the ones that produce synthetic diamonds, and the use of high-pressure nitrogen gas. The technical problems seemed insurmountable, so researchers since the 1960s have sought to deposit GaN on a base of readily available sapphire. But a mismatch between the structures of sapphire and gallium nitride created too many defects.

In 1992 Japanese inventor Shuji Nakamura invented the first efficient blue LED, and four years later, the first blue laser. Nakamura used the material deposited on the sapphire substrate, although the number of defects remained too high (106–1010/cm2) to easily build a high-power laser.

In the early 1990s the Institute of High Pressure Physics at the Polish Academy of Sciences in Warsaw (Poland), under the leadership of Dr. Sylwester Porowski developed technology to create gallium nitride crystals with high structural quality and fewer than 100 defects per square centimeter — at least 10,000 times better than the best sapphire-supported crystal.

In 1999, Nakamura tried Polish crystals, producing lasers with twice the yield and ten times the  lifetime — 3,000 hours at 30 mW.

A further development of the technology has led to mass production of the device. Today, blue lasers use a sapphire surface covered with a layer of gallium nitride (this technology is used by Japanese company Nichia, which has an agreement with Sony), and blue semiconductor lasers use a gallium nitride mono-crystal surface (Polish company TopGaN).

After 10 years, Japanese manufacturers mastered the production of a blue laser with 60 mW of power, making them applicable for devices that read a dense high-speed stream of data from Blu-ray, BD-R, and BD-RE. Polish technology is cheaper than Japanese but has a smaller share of the market. There is one more Polish high-tech company which creates gallium nitride crystal – Ammono, but this company does not produce blue lasers.

For his work, Nakamura received the Millennium Technology Prize awarded in 2006, and a Nobel Prize for Physics awarded in 2014.

Until the late 1990s, when blue semiconductor lasers were developed, blue lasers were large and expensive gas laser instruments which relied on population inversion in rare gas mixtures and needed high currents and strong cooling.

Thanks to prior development of many groups, including, most notably, Professor Isamu Akasaki's group, Shuji Nakamura at Nichia Corporation and Sony Corporation in Anan (Tokushima-ken, Japan) made a series of inventions and developed commercially viable blue and violet semiconductor lasers. The active layer of the Nichia devices was formed from InGaN quantum wells or quantum dots spontaneously formed via self-assembly. The new invention enabled the development of small, convenient and low-priced blue, violet, and ultraviolet (UV) lasers, which had not been available before, and opened the way for applications such as high-density HD DVD data storage and Blu-ray discs. The shorter wavelength allows it to read discs containing much more information.

Isamu Akasaki, Hiroshi Amano and Shuji Nakamura won the 2014 Nobel Prize in Physics "for the invention of efficient blue light-emitting diodes which has enabled bright and energy-saving white light sources".

Frequency doubled semiconductor lasers
Infrared lasers based on semiconductors have been readily available for decades, for instance as pump source for telecom or solid state lasers. These can be frequency-doubled to the blue range using standard nonlinear crystals. 

Violet lasers may be constructed directly with GaN (gallium nitride) semiconductors, as noted. However, a few higher-powered (120 mW) 404–405 nm "violet" laser pointers have become available which are not based on GaN, but also use frequency-doubler technology starting from 1 watt 808 nm gallium arsenide infrared diode lasers being directly doubled, without a longer-wave diode-pumped solid state laser interposed between diode laser and doubler-crystal.

Highest powers and wavelength tunability can be reached when the frequency doubling process is resonator enhanced, resulting in Watt-class sources spanning across the visible wavelength range. For instance, in  2.6 W of output power around 400 nm were demonstrated.

Diode-pumped solid state lasers 

Blue laser pointers, which became available around 2006, have the same basic construction as DPSS green lasers. They most commonly emit light at 473 nm, which is produced by frequency doubling of 946 nm laser radiation from a diode-pumped Nd:YAG or Nd:YVO4 crystal. Neodymium-doped crystals usually produce a principal wavelength of 1064 nm, but with the proper reflective coating mirrors can be also made to lase at other non-principal neodymium wavelengths, such as the 946 nm transition used in blue-laser applications. For high output power BBO crystals are used as frequency doublers; for lower powers, KTP is used. Output powers available are up to 5000 mW. Conversion efficiency for producing 473 nm laser radiation is inefficient with some of the best lab produced results coming in at 10-15% efficient at converting 946 nm laser radiation to 473 nm laser radiation. In practical applications, one can expect this to be even lower. Due to this low conversion efficiency, use of a 1000 mW IR diode results in at most 150 mW of visible blue light.

Blue lasers can also be fabricated directly with InGaN semiconductors, which produce blue light without frequency-doubling. 445 nm through 465 nm blue laser diodes are currently available on the open market. The devices are significantly brighter than 405 nm laser diodes, since the longer wavelength is closer to the peak sensitivity of the human eye. Commercial devices like laser projectors have driven down the prices on these diodes.

Appearance 

The violet 405 nm laser (whether constructed from GaN or frequency-doubled GaAs laser diodes) is not in fact blue, but appears to the eye as violet, a color for which a human eye has a very limited sensitivity. When pointed at many white objects (such as white paper or white clothes which have been washed in certain washing powders) the visual appearance of the laser dot changes from violet to blue, due to fluorescence of brightening dyes.

For display applications which must appear "true blue", a wavelength of 445–450 nm is required. With advances in production, and commercial sales of low-cost laser projectors, 445 nm InGaN laser diodes have dropped in price.

Applications 

Areas of application of the blue laser include:

 High-definition Blu-ray players
 DLP and 3LCD projectors
 Telecommunications
 Information technology
 Environmental monitoring
 Electronic equipment
 Medical diagnostics
 Handheld projectors and displays
 Communication with submarines

See also
List of laser articles

References 

Laser types
Blu-ray Disc
Japanese inventions